The Subject Tonight Is Love is an album by Kate McGarry, Keith Ganz and Gary Versace The album received a Grammy Award nomination in 2019 for Best Jazz Vocal Album. It was named after a poem by 14th Century poet Hafiz.

Track listing

Personnel
 Kate McGarry – piano, vocals
 Keith Ganz – guitar, bass guitar, drums
 Gary Versace – accordion, keyboards
 Ron Miles – trumpet
 Obed Calvaire – drums

References

2017 albums
Jazz albums